Petrarca Rugby is a rugby union club from Padua, Italy, currently competing in the top tier of the Italian rugby union, the Top10.

Founded in 1947, the team is the rugby union branch of the Unione Sportiva Petrarca, an omnisport club that includes also basketball, futsal, volleyball, fencing and football.

They have won 14 league titles, 11 of them between 1969–70 and 1986-87 seasons; their most recent successes in the Italian championship came 24 years after their latest feat, at the end of the 2010-11 season, and the last one in the 2017-18 season.

Petrarca is the 3rd most successful side in the Italian championship behind Amatori Milano (18 titles) and Benetton Treviso (15).

Honours
 Italian championship
 Champions (14): 1969–70, 1970–71, 1971–72, 1972–73, 1973–74, 1976–77, 1979–80, 1983–84, 1984–85, 1985–86, 1986–87, 2010–11, 2017–18, 2021−22
 Runners-up (3): 1997–98, 1998–99, 2020−21
Coppa Italia/Excellence Trophy
 Champions (3): 1981–82, 2000–01, 2021−22
 Runners-up (4): 1980–81, 2007–08, 2009–10, 2015–16

Current squad
The squad for the Top10 season is:

Selected former players

Italian players
Former players who have played for Petrarca and have caps for Italy:

  Giuseppe Artuso
  Enrico Bacchin
  Mattia Bellini
  Alberto Benettin
  Mauro Bergamasco
  Mirco Bergamasco
  Lucio Boccaletto
  Marco Bortolami
  Alberto Chillon
  Oscar Collodo
  Manuel Dallan
  Renato de Bernardo
  Paul Derbyshire
  Piergianni Farina
  Roberto Favaro
  Antonio Galeazzo
  Mauro Gardin
  Guglielmo Geremia
  Leonardo Ghiraldini
  Marzio Innocenti
  Andrea Marcato
  Luca Martin
  Fulvio Lorigiola
  Luigi Luise
  Luciano Orquera
  Mario Piovan
  Pasquale Presutti
  Michele Rizzo
  Roberto Saetti
  Alberto Sgarbi

Overseas players
Former players who have played for Petrarca and have caps for their respective country:

  Mark Bartholomeusz
  David Campese
  David Knox
  Brendan Williams
  Sisa Koyamaibole
  Nicky Little
  Guy Pardiès
  Stuart Grimes
  Theuns Stofberg
  Rudolf Straeuli
  Cameron Oliver
  Kobus Wiese
  James Faiva
  Richie Collins

Statistics

European Challenge Cup (1996–2014)

European Shield

Heineken Cup (1995–2014)

References

External links
 

Italian rugby union teams
Sport in Padua